Feride Akgün (born 1973) is a Turkish former footballer, who played as forward in the Turkish Women's  League for various clubs, and the Turkey women's national team. She was named three times league top goalscorer.

Early years
Akgün professionally played volleyball at Galatasaray. She then switched over to football.

Club career
Akgün played for the Istanbul-based Turkish Women's League clubs Dinarsuspor (1990-1997) and Marshall Boyaspor (1997–2001). She enjoyed four league champion and one Federation Cup champion titles. During her time at Dinarsuspor, she became the most goalscorer with 54 gaols. She was named three times top goalscorer.

In 2001, she went to Germany, and played trials with FCR 2001 Duisburg and the B-team of FC Bayern Munich.

International career
Akgğn was a member of the Turkey national team between 1995 and 2002, capping 29 matches and scoring one goal. She played at the UEFA Euro 1997 qualifying, 1999 FIFA World Cup qualification, UEFA Euro 2001 qualifying, and 2003 FIFA World Cup qualification matches.

Later years
In 2016, "İstanbul Akademi Futbol Okulları" (Istanbul Academy Football Schools), an institution for football infrastructure, added Akgün to their staff.

References

1973 births
Living people
Turkish women's volleyball players
Galatasaray S.K. (women's volleyball) players
Turkish women's footballers
Women's association football forwards
Turkey women's international footballers
Dinarsuspor players